Bernd Baumann (born 31 January 1958) is a German politician of the Alternative for Germany (AfD) and chief whip of the AfD Group who has been serving as a member of the Bundestag from the state of Hamburg since 2017.

Life and politics

Baumann was born 1958 in the West German city Herne and studied economics at the Ruhr University Bochum and achieved his PhD in 1991.

Baumann eventuated the newly founded populist AfD in 2013 and was presider (Landessprecher) of the party in the city state of Hamburg from 2015 to 2017.

In 2017 Baumann became the first chief whip (Erster Parlamentarischer Geschäftsführer) of the AfD in the Bundestag.

References

1958 births
People from Herne, North Rhine-Westphalia
Members of the Bundestag for Hamburg
Living people
Members of the Bundestag 2017–2021
Members of the Bundestag 2021–2025
Members of the Bundestag for the Alternative for Germany